The second cabinet of Ion Ghica was the government of Romania from 15 July 1866 to 21 February 1867.

Ministers
The ministers of the cabinet were as follows:

President of the Council of Ministers:
Ion Ghica (15 July 1866 - 21 February 1867)
Minister of the Interior: 
Ion Ghica (15 July 1866 - 21 February 1867)
Minister of Foreign Affairs: 
George B. Știrbei (15 July 1866 - 21 February 1867)
Minister of Finance:
Petre Mavrogheni (15 July 1866 - 21 February 1867)
Minister of Justice:
Ion C. Cantacuzino (15 July 1866 - 21 February 1867)
Minister of War:
Col. Ioan Gr. Ghica (15 July - 6 August 1866)
Col. Nicolae Haralambie (6 August 1866 - 8 February 1867)
Gen. Tobias Gherghely (8 - 21 February 1867)
Minister of Religious Affairs:
Constantin A. Rosetti (15 - 19 July 1866)
Ion Strat (19 July 1866 - 21 February 1867)
Minister of Public Works:
Dimitrie A. Sturdza (15 July 1866 - 21 February 1867)

References

Cabinets of Romania
Cabinets established in 1866
Cabinets disestablished in 1867
1866 establishments in Romania
1867 disestablishments in Romania